Abdul Momin Talukder (born 29 June 1952) is a Bangladesh Nationalist Party (BNP) politician and a former Jatiya Sangsad member representing the Bogra-3 constituency during 2001–2014.

In November 2021, Talukder was sentenced to death by the International Crimes Tribunal for his conviction in war crime charges during the Bangladesh Liberation War in 1971.

Career
Talukder served as an assistant organising secretary of BNP central committee of the Rajshahi division. He was elected to parliament from Bogra-3 as a BNP candidate in 2001 and 2008 elections. Talukder's father, Abdul Majid Talukdar, represented the same constituency during 1991–2001. In 2018, Talukder's wife, Masuda Momen, was awarded the BNP nomination for Bogra-3 after his brother, Abdul Mohit Talukder, nomination was declared illegal by the Bangladesh High Court.

War crime charges and convictions
Talukder was sued on 8 March 2011 by Mohammad Subed Ali, a veteran of Bangladesh Liberation war, for war crimes and murder of two Mukti Bahini members during the war. In 2017, warrants were issued against him on war crime charges by the International Crimes Tribunal.

On 25 November 2021, Talukder was sentenced to death by the tribunal for his crimes against humanity. Since he was absconding, he was tried in absentia and faced a total three charges. The tribunal's investigation agency stated that in 1971, Talukder had served as the Razakar commander of Adamdighi Police Station in Bogra and was involved in the killing of at least 19 people.

The charges Talukder was convicted of are:
 On 22 April 1971, Talukder killed at least 10 people, including a freedom fighter.
 During 24–27 October 1971, Talukder conducted raids in Kashimala village and looted 16-17 homes and murdered 5 people.
 On 25 October 1971, Talukder killed four people from Adamdighi’s Talshan village.

References

Living people
1952 births
People from Bogra District
Bangladesh Nationalist Party politicians
8th Jatiya Sangsad members
9th Jatiya Sangsad members
Bangladeshi people convicted of war crimes
Bangladeshi politicians convicted of crimes
Bangladeshi male criminals
Place of birth missing (living people)